Gečerlija is a village in the municipality of Bosilovo, North Macedonia.

Demographics
According to the 2002 census, the village had a total of 315 inhabitants.  Ethnic groups in the village include:

Macedonians 373

References

External links
 Visit Macedonia

Villages in Bosilovo Municipality